Devastated may refer to:
 "Devastated" (Sam Clark song), a 2010 single by Sam Clark
 "Devastated" (Joey Badass song), a 2016 single by Joey Badass

See also
 Devastation (disambiguation)